Lisa Kristina Ajax (born 13 August 1998), is a Swedish singer, and winner of  Idol 2014.

She also participated at Lilla Melodifestivalen 2012 with the song "Allt som jag har". Ajax participated in Melodifestivalen 2016 with the song "My Heart Wants Me Dead", and qualified to the finals at Friends Arena. She placed seventh in the final.

On 30 November 2016, the Swedish broadcaster, SVT, revealed the participants of Melodifestivalen 2017. Ajax participated with the song "I Don't Give A". She qualified to andra chansen from the second semi-final. She went to the final on 11 March 2017 where she placed ninth.

On 27 November 2018, it was revealed that Ajax would participate in Melodifestivalen 2019 with the song "Torn", in the last semi-final. She again qualified to andra chansen from the fourth semi-final and finished in ninth place in the final.

She participated in Melodifestivalen 2022 with the song ”Tror du att jag bryr mig” with Niello. They performed in Heat 2 on 12 February 2022, finishing in last place and failing to qualify.

In 2021, Ajax released her first single in Swedish, “Jag måste”, The song is written by Anton Engdahl, Marcus Holmberg and Lisa herself. She is under new management and a new label. 

She competes as a celebrity dancer in Let's Dance 2022, which is broadcast by TV4.

Discography

EPs

Singles

Notes

References

External links

Official Instagram page

1998 births
Living people
Idol (Swedish TV series) winners
Swedish pop singers
English-language singers from Sweden
21st-century Swedish singers
21st-century Swedish women singers
Melodifestivalen contestants of 2022
Melodifestivalen contestants of 2019
Melodifestivalen contestants of 2017
Melodifestivalen contestants of 2016